In two-body, Keplerian orbital mechanics, the equation of the center is the angular difference between the actual position of a body in its elliptical orbit and the position it would occupy if its motion were uniform, in a circular orbit of the same period. It is defined as the difference true anomaly, minus mean anomaly, and is typically expressed a function of mean anomaly, and orbital eccentricity, .

Discussion
Since antiquity, the problem of predicting the motions of the heavenly bodies has been simplified by reducing it to one of a single body in orbit about another. In calculating the position of the body around its orbit, it is often convenient to begin by assuming circular motion. This first approximation is then simply a constant angular rate multiplied by an amount of time. There are various methods of proceeding to correct the approximate circular position to that produced by elliptical motion, many of them complex, and many involving solution of Kepler's equation. In contrast, the equation of the center is one of the easiest methods to apply.

In cases of small eccentricity, the position given by the equation of the center can be nearly as accurate as any other method of solving the problem. Many orbits of interest, such as those of bodies in the Solar System or of artificial Earth satellites, have these nearly-circular orbits. As eccentricity becomes greater, and orbits more elliptical, the equation's accuracy declines, failing completely at the highest values, hence it is not used for such orbits.

The equation in its modern form can be truncated at any arbitrary level of accuracy, and when limited to just the most important terms, it can produce an easily calculated approximation of the true position when full accuracy is not important. Such approximations can be used, for instance, as starting values for iterative solutions of Kepler's equation, or in calculating rise or set times, which due to atmospheric effects cannot be predicted with much precision.

The ancient Greeks, in particular Hipparchus, knew the equation of the center as prostaphaeresis, although their understanding of the geometry of the planets' motion was not the same. The word equation (Latin, aequatio, -onis) in the present sense comes from astronomy. It was specified and used by Kepler, as that variable quantity determined by calculation which must be added or subtracted from the mean motion to obtain the true motion. In astronomy, the term equation of time has a similar meaning. The equation of the center in modern form was developed as part of perturbation analysis, that is, the study of the effects of a third body on two-body motion.

Series expansion 

In Keplerian motion, the coordinates of the body retrace the same values with each orbit, which is the definition of a periodic function. Such functions can be expressed as periodic series of any continuously increasing angular variable, and the variable of most interest is the mean anomaly, . Because it increases uniformly with time, expressing any other variable as a series in mean anomaly is essentially the same as expressing it in terms of time. Note that while these series can be presented in truncated form, they represent a sum of an infinite number of terms.

where

 are the Bessel functions and

The result is in radians.

Substituting and reducing, the equation for  becomes (truncated at order ),

and by the definition, moving  to the left-hand side,

gives the equation of the center.

which is identical to the above form.

For small , the series converges rapidly.

Examples

See also
Celestial mechanics
Gravitational two-body problem
Kepler orbit
Kepler problem
Two-body problem

References

Further reading
Marth, A. (1890). On the computation of the equation of the centre in elliptical orbits of moderate eccentricities. Monthly Notices of the Royal Astronomical Society, Vol. 50, p. 502. Gives the equation of the center to order e10.
Morrison, J. (1883). On the computation of the eccentric anomaly, equation of the centre and radius vector of a planet, in terms of the mean anomaly and eccentricity. Monthly Notices of the Royal Astronomical Society, Vol. 43, p. 345. Gives the equation of the center to order e12.
Morrison, J. (1883). Errata. Monthly Notices of the Royal Astronomical Society, Vol. 43, p. 494.

Orbits